In Māori tradition, Te Rangiuamutu (also known as Tairea) was one of the great ocean-going, voyaging canoes that was used in the migrations that settled New Zealand. Taranaki iwi Ngāti Ruanui and Ngā Rauru link their ancestry to Tamatearokai the captain of Te Rangiuamutu.

See also
List of Māori waka

References

Māori waka
Māori mythology